Eskil Johannes Lundahl (7 September 1905 – 10 November 1992) was a Swedish swimmer who competed in the 1928, 1932 and 1948 Summer Olympics.

In the 1928 he was a member of the Swedish team that finished fifth in the 4×200 m freestyle relay. He was eliminated in a semi-final of the 100 m backstroke and in first round of the 100 m freestyle event. Four years later he was again eliminated in the first round of the 100 m freestyle and 100 m backstroke competitions.

At the 1948 Summer Olympics he participated as an architect in the art competition.

References

1905 births
1992 deaths
Swedish male freestyle swimmers
Swedish male backstroke swimmers
Olympic swimmers of Sweden
Swimmers at the 1928 Summer Olympics
Swimmers at the 1932 Summer Olympics
Sportspeople from Malmö
European Aquatics Championships medalists in swimming
Olympic competitors in art competitions
20th-century Swedish people